Ranjit Ramchandra Desai (8 April 1928 – 6 March 1992) was an Indian Marathi-language writer from Maharashtra, India. He is best known for his historical novels Swami and Shriman Yogi. He was awarded the Sahitya Akademi Award in 1964 and the Padma Shri in 1973.

Works
Desai's most prominent creations are "Swami" and "Shriman Yogi". His other works are as below.

Novels
 Radheya - A Story narrating the life of 'Karna' - The Eldest of all Pandav's and his tyranny.
Swami - Received  Sahitya Akademi award
 Shrimaan Yogi - Based on Chatrapati Shivaji Maharaj
 Baari
 Raja Ravi Varma
 Pavankhind
 Lakshavedh
 Maza Gaon
 Shekara
 Pratiksha
 Abhogi
 Samidha

Collections of short stories
 Roop Mahal
 Madhumati
 Jaan
 Kanav
 Gandhali
 Aalekh
 Kamodini
 Morpankhi Sawalya
 Katal
 Babulmora
 Sanket
 Prapat
 Megh
 Vaishakh
 Ashadh
 Mekh Mogari
 Sneha Dhara

Plays
 Kanchan Mrug
 Dhan Apure
 Pankh Zale Vairi
 Sangeet Samrat Tansen
 Garud Zep
 Ram Shashtri
 Shriman Yogi
 Swami
 Warasa
 Pangulgada
 Lok Nayak
 He Bandh Reshmache
 Tuzi Wat Wegali
 Sawali Unnhachi

Movie scripts
 Rangalya Ratri Ashya
 Sawal Maza Aika
 Nagin
Sangoli Rayana
 Rang Rasiya

Awards
 Maharashtra Rajya Award (1963) (for Swami)
 Hari Narayan Apte Award (1963) (for Swami)
 Sahitya Akademi Award (1964) (for Swami)
 Padma Shri from the Government of India (1973)
 Maharashtra Gaurav Puraskar (1990)

Notes

Indian male poets
Marathi-language writers
People from Kolhapur district
Recipients of the Sahitya Akademi Award in Marathi
Recipients of the Padma Shri in literature & education
1928 births
1992 deaths
20th-century Indian poets
Poets from Maharashtra
Indian male novelists
20th-century Indian novelists
20th-century Indian male writers
Novelists from Maharashtra